Bisbee is a city in and the county seat of Cochise County in southeastern Arizona, United States. According to the 2020 census, the population of the town was 4,923, down from 5,575 in the 2010 census.

History

Bisbee was founded as a copper, gold, and silver mining town in 1880, and named in honor of Judge DeWitt Bisbee, one of the financial backers of the adjacent Copper Queen Mine.

The town was the site of the Bisbee Riot in 1919.

In 1929, the county seat was moved from Tombstone to Bisbee, where it remains.

Mining industry
Mining in the Mule Mountains proved quite successful: in the early 20th century the population of Bisbee soared. Incorporated in 1902, by 1910 its population had swelled to 9,019, and it sported a constellation of suburbs, including Warren, Lowell, and San Jose, some of which had been founded on their own (ultimately less successful) mines. In 1917, open-pit mining was successfully introduced to meet the copper demand during World War I.

A high quality turquoise promoted as Bisbee Blue was a by-product of the copper mining. Many high-quality mineral specimens have come from Bisbee area mines and are to be found in museum collections worldwide. Some of these minerals include cuprite, aragonite, wulfenite, malachite, azurite, and galena.

Bisbee deportation

Miners attempted to organize to gain better working conditions and wages. In 1917, the Phelps Dodge Corporation, using private police and deputized sheriffs in conjunction with Cochise County Sheriff Harry C. Wheeler, transported at gunpoint over 1,000 striking miners out of town to Hermanas, New Mexico, due to allegations that they were members of the Industrial Workers of the World (IWW); the company wanted to prevent unionization. Earlier that year, industry police conducted the Jerome Deportation, similarly intended to expel striking miners.

Mining decline and tourism
Continued underground work enabled the town to survive the changes in mining that caused mines in neighboring towns to close, leading to a resulting dramatic loss of population. But the population of Bisbee had dropped nearly 60%, from a high of 9,205 in 1920 down to 3,801 by 1950. In 1975 the Phelps Dodge Corporation halted its Bisbee copper-mining operations. Bisbee Mayor Chuck Eads, with the cooperation of Phelps Dodge, implemented development of a mine tour and historic interpretation of a portion of the Copper Queen Mine as part of an effort to create heritage tourism as another economic base to compensate for the financial loss due to the end of the mining industry.

Community volunteers cleared tons of fallen rock and re-timbered the old workings. Eventually, this local effort came to the attention of the federal Economic Development Administration. It approved a large grant to the City of Bisbee to help the mine tour project and other improvements in downtown Bisbee; these were designed to meet tourist business needs. The Queen Mine Tour was officially opened to visitors on February 1, 1976. More than a million visitors have taken the underground mine tour train.

Modern Bisbee

From 1950 to 1960, the sharp population decline happening over the previous few decades changed course and the number of residents of Bisbee increased by nearly 160 percent when open-pit mining was undertaken and the city annexed nearby areas. The peak population was in 1960, at 9,914.

In the following decade, there was a decline in jobs and population, although not as severe as from 1930 to 1950. But, the economic volatility resulted in a crash in housing prices. Coupled with an attractive climate and picturesque scenery, Bisbee became a destination in the 1960s for artists and hippies of the counter culture.

Artist Stephen Hutchison and his wife Marcia purchased the Copper Queen Hotel, the town's anchor business and architectural gem, from the Phelps-Dodge mining company in 1970. The company had tried to find a local buyer, offering the deed to any local resident for the sum of $1, but there were no takers. The property needed renovation for continued use.

Hutchison purchased and renovated the hotel, as well as other buildings in the downtown area. One held the early 20th-century Brewery and Stock Exchange. Hutchison began to market Bisbee as a destination of the "authentic," old Southwest. His work attracted the developer Ed Smart.

Among the many guests at the hotel have been celebrities from nearby California. Actor John Wayne was a frequent visitor to Bisbee and the Copper Queen. He befriended Hutchison and eventually partnered with Smart in his real estate ventures. This period of Bisbee's history is well documented in contemporary articles in The New Yorker and in an article by Cynthia Buchanan in The Cornell Review. It was at this time that Bisbee became a haven for artists and hippies fleeing the larger cities of Arizona and California. Later it attracted people priced out by gentrification of places such as Aspen, Colorado.

In the 1990s, additional people were attracted to Bisbee, leading it to develop such amenities as coffee shops and live theatre. Many of the old houses have been renovated, and property values in Bisbee now greatly exceed those of other southeastern Arizona cities.

Today, the historic city of Bisbee is known as "Old Bisbee" and is home to a thriving downtown cultural scene. This area is noted for its architecture, including Victorian-style houses and an elegant Art Deco county courthouse. Because its plan was laid out to a pedestrian scale before the automobile, Old Bisbee is compact and walkable. The town's hilly terrain is exemplified by the old four-story high school; each floor has a ground-level entrance.

Suburbs
The city of Bisbee now includes the satellite communities of Warren, Lowell, and San Jose. The Lowell and Warren townsites were consolidated into Bisbee proper during the early part of the twentieth century. There are also smaller neighborhoods interspersed between these larger boroughs, including Galena, Bakerville, Tintown, South Bisbee, Briggs, and Saginaw.

Warren was Arizona's first planned community.  It was designed as a bedroom community for the more affluent citizens of the mining district.  Warren has a fine collection of Arts and Crafts style bungalow houses. Many have been recognized as historic places, and the city has an annual home tour during which a varying selection are offered for tours. Since the end of mining in the 1970s, Warren has seen a steady decline in its standard of living. The residential district still houses a significant portion of the population, and includes City Hall, Greenway Elementary School, Bisbee High School, and the historic Warren Ballpark.

Lowell was at one time a sizable mining town located just to the southeast of Old Bisbee. The majority of the original townsite was consumed by the excavation of the Lavender Pit mine during the 1950s. All that is left today is a small portion of Erie Street, along with Evergreen Cemetery, Saginaw subdivision and Lowell Middle School. These days Lowell is considered by most of the local residents to be more of a place name than an operating community.

San Jose, on the southern side of the Mule Mountains, is the most modern of the city's subdivisions. As it is not restricted by mountains, it has had the most new growth since the late 1990s. Named after a nearby Mexican mountain peak, it is the location of many newer county government buildings, the Huachuca Terrace Elementary School, and a large shopping center.

Current state of mining industry
In 2007, Freeport-McMoRan Copper & Gold bought Phelps-Dodge company. Freeport has invested in Bisbee by remediating soil contaminated in previous mining operations, donations to the school system, and other civic activities.

Geography

Natural vegetation around Bisbee has a semi-desert appearance with shrubby acacia, oak and the like, along with cacti, grass, ocotillo and yucca. The town itself is much more luxuriant with large trees such as native cypress, sycamore and cottonwood plus the introduced ailanthus and Old World cypresses, cedars and pines. Palms are capable of growing tall, but are not reliably hardy. At least one mature blue spruce may be seen.

Climate
Bisbee is a typical semi-arid climate (Köppen BSk) of the upland Mountain West. During the winter, frontal cloudbands may bring occasional rainfall or even snowfall, though average maxima in the winter are typically very mild and sometimes even warm.

Demographics

Bisbee first appeared on the 1890 U.S. Census as an unincorporated village. It did not appear on the 1900 census, despite having a population of thousands (many unincorporated communities were not reported). In 1902, it incorporated as a city and has appeared on every census since 1910. On September 10, 1959, it incorporated the adjacent unincorporated villages of Lowell-South Bisbee (1950 pop. 1,136) and Warren (pop. 2,610).

As of the census of 2000, there were 6,090 people, 2,810 households, and 1,503 families residing in the city. The racial and ethnic makeup of the city (where race/ethnicity of residents was known) was 65.2% non-Hispanic White, 29.2% of the population were Hispanic or Latino of any race, 0.7% Non-Hispanic Black or African American, 0.6% Non-Hispanic Native American, 0.5% Non-Hispanic Asian, 0.1% Native Hawaiian or Pacific Islander, 0.5% from other races, and 3.3% from two or more races.

There were 2,810 households, out of which 21.7% had children under the age of 18 living with them, 36.8% were married couples living together, 12.8% had a female householder with no husband present, and 46.5% were non-families. 39.1% of all households were made up of individuals, and 14.6% had someone living alone who was 65 years of age or older. The average household size was 2.15 and the average family size was 2.90.

An analysis of United States Census Bureau data by researchers at The Williams Institute at the UCLA School of Law found that, on a proportional basis, Bisbee had more gay couples living together than anywhere else in the state. The ratio was 20.9 for every 1,000 households.

In the city, the age distribution of the population shows 21.6% under the age of 18, 6.8% from 18 to 24, 24.1% from 25 to 44, 27.8% from 45 to 64, and 19.6% who were 65 years of age or older. The median age was 43 years. For every 100 females, there were 90.6 males. For every 100 females age 18 and over, there were 85.1 males.

The median income for a household in the city was $27,942, and the median income for a family was $36,685. Males had a median income of $29,573 versus $23,269 for females. The per capita income for the city was $17,129. About 12.9% of families and 17.5% of the population were below the poverty line, including 23.2% of those under age 18 and 9.0% of those age 65 or over.

Arts and culture

The Bisbee 1000 Stair Climb is a five-kilometer run through the city that traverses 1,034 stairs. Billed as "the most unique physical fitness challenge in the USA!" by the organizers, the Climb includes runners being serenaded by musicians at various locations among the stairs. The event has grown to include the Ice Man Competition, designed to honor the history of men delivering blocks of ice by hand before the advent of refrigeration. In the Ice Man Competition, entrants race up 155 steps carrying a ten-pound block of ice with antique ice tongs.

Bisbee hosts an annual Blues festival, occurring in 2015 during the second week of September. The festival effectively lengthens the tourist season, and provides a large amount of business to local bars and breweries.

Sites of interest
 Bisbee Municipal Airport
 The Central School, built in 1905, was once an elementary school and now functions as an art center.
 The Cochise County Courthouse is built in the Art Deco style.
 The Copper Queen Mine was once a major copper producer and can be toured daily.
 The Phelps Dodge General Office Building, a National Historic Landmark, is now the Bisbee Mining & Historical Museum
 The Lavender Pit is an inactive open pit mine site in the center of the city.
 Warren Ballpark, a baseball stadium built in 1909, has housed a number of professional teams and may be baseball's oldest park still in use.

Sports
Bisbee joined with Clifton in forming a cricket team that travelled to Santa Monica, California, in 1908 to play the Santa Monica Cricket Club in two games overlooking the Pacific Ocean on the grounds of the Polo Field. The miners lost both cricket games. The Copper Echo reported that Bennie, the general manager of the Shannon Company Copper Mine, was the miners' best cricketer.

Bisbee was home to a minor league baseball franchise. The Bisbee Bees played as members of the Arizona State League and Arizona-Texas League.

Government
Bisbee is governed via the mayor-council system. The city council consists of six members who are elected from three wards, each ward elects two members. The mayor is elected in a direct citywide vote.

In 2013, the city council received public notoriety when it proposed same-sex civil unions and shortly after became the first municipality in Arizona to pass a civil union law. The state's Attorney General, Tom Horne, threatened to sue, but decided against it after Bisbee amended the ordinance; the civil union ordinance came into effect July 5, 2013. "Bisbee was the first in Arizona to approve civil unions, with Tucson, Jerome and Clarkdale following."

Infrastructure

Transportation
The City of Bisbee administers the Bisbee Bus System which is in fact operated by the City of Douglas under contract, with regularly scheduled services from Monday through Saturday within Bisbee and to Naco; One-way fare is $1; The City of Douglas also operates the Cochise Connection, with regular shuttle services between Douglas, Bisbee, and Sierra Vista; One-way fare is $3–4.

Notable people

 Buster Adams, professional baseball player
 Betty Bays (1931–1992), All-American Girls Professional Baseball League
 Ben Chase, NFL player
 Gib Dawson, NFL player
 James Douglas, Canadian metallurgist and founder of the Copper Queen Mine
 Lewis Williams Douglas (1894–1974), politician, businessman diplomat and academic
 M. J. Frankovich, UCLA quarterback, movie producer (The Shootist, Cactus Flower)
 Jess Hartley, author, blogger and game designer for White Wolf Games
 Earl Hindman, actor, best known for portraying Wilson W. Wilson Jr. on the sitcom Home Improvement, was born in Bisbee in 1942
 J. A. Jance, author
 Jake LaMotta ("The Raging Bull"), former middleweight prizefighting champion, made Bisbee one of his homes in retirement
 Clarence Maddern, professional baseball player ca. 1946–1951
 James F. McNulty Jr. (1925–2009), member of the U.S. House of Representatives
 William Milam, diplomat and former US Ambassador to Pakistan and Bangladesh
 Paul Newman, Corporation Commissioner, former state representative, former Cochise County Supervisor
 Richard Shelton, author
 William P. Sims, Arizona state senator
 Doug Stanhope, comedian and writer
 Betsy Thornton, writer
 Dawson Trotman, (1906–1956) Founder of The Navigators Born in Bisbee
 Ken Westerfield, disc sports (Frisbee) pioneer, hall of fame, showman, promoter
 Jack Williamson, science-fiction writer, born 1908, in Bisbee
 Peter Young, artist

In popular culture

Film
 The 2018 documentary Bisbee '17 chronicled the Bisbee Deportation on the 100th anniversary of the incident.
 Violent Saturday (1955) was film was filmed in Bisbee
 In 3:10 to Yuma (1957), the gang stops in Bisbee to meet and mislead the marshal.
 In L.A. Confidential, Lynn Bracken (played by Kim Basinger) is from Bisbee, as revealed by the hand-embroidered cushion in her bedroom.
 In the 1993 film "Tombstone", a Cowboy watching a man juggle says, "Professor Gillman? Oh, I saw him in Bisbee. He catches stuff."
 In season 1 episode 6 of Supernatural, Dean claims to be a detective from Bisbee.

See also

 Arizona Cactus Botanical Garden
 Bisbee-Douglas International Airport
 Bisbee Riot
 List of historic properties in Bisbee, Arizona
 Southeastern Arizona Bird Observatory
 
 Warren–Bisbee Railway

References

Further reading
 Martinelli, Phylis Cancilla. Undermining Race: Ethnic Identities in Arizona Copper Camps, 1880–1920 (Tucson: University of Arizona Press, 2009). xii, 225 pp. 
 Graeme, R.W., 1987, "Bisbee, Arizona's Dowager Queen of Mining Camps; A Look at Her First 50 Years", in History of Mining in Arizona, vol. 1. Full text:

External links

 
 
 Warren – ghosttowns.com

 
1880 establishments in Arizona Territory
Artist colonies
Cities in Arizona
Cities in Cochise County, Arizona
Cochise County conflict
Company towns in Arizona
County seats in Arizona
Geological type localities
Industrial Workers of the World in Arizona
Mining communities in Arizona
Populated places established in 1880